Maytenus williamsii is a species of plant in the family Celastraceae. It is endemic to Honduras.

References

williamsii
Endemic flora of Honduras
Trees of Honduras
Critically endangered flora of North America
Taxonomy articles created by Polbot
Plants described in 1951